Griselles is a commune in the Côte-d'Or department in eastern France.

Population

See also
Communes of the Côte-d'Or department

References

Communes of Côte-d'Or
Lingones